Vikom Music is a Bosnian commercial music cable television channel based in Bosanska Gradiška, Bosnia and Herzegovina. The program is mainly produced in Serbian. The TV station was established in 2013.

References

External links 
 Communications Regulatory Agency of Bosnia and Herzegovina

Television stations in Bosnia and Herzegovina
Television channels and stations established in 2013